Rich Parrinello (born March 3, 1950) is a former American football coach.  He served as the head football coach at the University of Chicago in 1988 and at the University of Rochester from 1989 to 1997, compiling a career college football record of 44–49.

Coaching career
Parrinello was the head football coach at the University of Chicago.  He held that position for the 1988 season.  His coaching record at Chicago was 3–6."

Head coaching record

References

1950 births
Living people
Chicago Maroons football coaches
Rochester Yellowjackets football coaches
University of Rochester alumni